Trbušani is a village located in the city of Čačak, Serbia. According to the 2011 census, it has a population of 1,968 inhabitants.

References

Populated places in Moravica District